George Fuller may refer to:
George Fuller (Australian politician) (1861–1940), twice Premier of New South Wales, Australia
George Fuller (painter) (1822–1884), American figure and portrait painter
George Fuller (congressman) (1802–1888), U.S. Representative from Pennsylvania
George A. Fuller (1851–1900), architect and general contractor, "inventor" of modern skyscrapers
George C. Fuller, American theologian and seminary president
George Fuller (British politician) (1833–1927), British Liberal politician
George F. Fuller (1869–1962), industrialist in Worcester, Massachusetts, United States
George W. Fuller (1868–1934), sanitary engineer
George Fuller (architect), Chicago architect, colleague of Floyd Naramore